

Main Political Parties
BJD: Biju Janta Dal
BJP: Bharatiya Janata Party
INC: Indian National Congress
CPI: Communist Party of India
CPI(M): Communist Party of India (Marxist)
AIFB:All India Forward Bloc
Swatantra Party
Janata Party
Janata Dal

Lok Sabha Results from Odisha
 1951-52: Total: 20. Congress: 11, GP: 6 
 1957: Total: 20.
 1962: Total: 20.
 1967: Total: 20. Swatantra: 8, Congress: 6, PSP: 4, SSP: 1, Ind: 1
 1971: Total: 20. Congress: 15, Swatantra: 3, CPI: 1
 1977: Total: 21. Janata Party + CPM = 15+1 = 16, Congress: 4
 1980: Total: 21. Congress: 20, Janata (S): 1 (Biju Patnaik)
 1984: Total: 21. Congress: 20, Janata (S): 1 (Biju Patnaik)
 1996: Total: 21. Congress: 17; Janata Dal : 3 (Biju Patnaik + 2 more)
 1998: Total: 21. BJD+BJP:  9+7 = 16; Congress: 5
 1999: Total: 21. BJD+BJP: 10+9 = 19; Congress: 2
 2004: Total: 21. BJD+BJP: 11+7 = 18; Congress: 2; JMM (Jharkhand Mukti Morcha): 1
 2009: Total: 21. BJD: 14, Congress: 6, CPI: 1
 2014: Total: 21. Biju Janata Dal: 20, BJP: 1, Congress: 0
 2019: Total: 21. Biju Janata Dal: 12, BJP: 8, Congress: 1

Legislative Assembly election results of Odisha

1951-52
Chief Minister(s): Nabakrushna Choudhury, Harekrushna Mahatab (Both Congress)

1957
Chief Minister(s): Harekrushna Mehtab (Congress)

1961
Chief Minister(s): Biju Patnaik, Biren Mitra, Sadashiva Tripathy (All from Congress)

1967
Chief Minister: Rajendra Narayan Singh Deo (Swatantra Party)

1971

1974

1977

1980

1985

1990

1995

2000

2004

2009
Chief Minister(s): Naveen Patnaik (Biju Janata Dal)

2014
Chief Minister(s): Naveen Patnaik (Biju Janata Dal) 
 

|- align=center
!style="background-color:#E9E9E9" class="unsortable"|
!style="background-color:#E9E9E9" align=center|Political Party
!style="background-color:#E9E9E9" |Seats won
!style="background-color:#E9E9E9" |Number of Votes
!style="background-color:#E9E9E9" |% of Votes
!style="background-color:#E9E9E9" |Seat change
|-
| 
|align="left"|Biju Janata Dal||117||9,334,852||43.4|| 14
|-
| 
|align="left"|Indian National Congress||16||5,535,670||25.7|| 11
|-
| 
|align="left"|Bharatiya Janata Party||10||3,874,739||18.0|| 4
|-
| 
|align="left"|Communist Party of India (Marxist)||1||80,274||0.4|| 1
|-
| 
|align="left"|Samata Kranti Dal||1||86,539||0.4|| 1
|-
| 
|align="left"|Independents||2||1,084,764||5.0|| 4
|-
|
|align="left"|Total||147||||||
|-
|}

2019

References

External links